Cody is an unincorporated community in western Jefferson County, Florida, United States.  It is west of Wacissa near the Leon County/Jefferson County line.

Cody was serviced by the Florida Central Railroad, and had its own post office from 1912 through 1937.

Points of interest near Cody include the Plank Road State Forest, the St. Marks River State Park and the Natural Bridge Battlefield Historic State Park. The elevation of Cody is 33 feet.

Education
Jefferson County Schools operates public schools, including Jefferson County Middle / High School.

References

Unincorporated communities in Jefferson County, Florida
Tallahassee metropolitan area
Unincorporated communities in Florida